is a 1980 film directed by Kon Ichikawa starring Momoe Yamaguchi and Tomokazu Miura in an adaptation of Yasunari Kawabata's novel The Old Capital. Momoe Yamaguchi and Masaya Oki made their last appearances in the film.

It is a remake of the 1963 film Twin Sisters of Kyoto.

Cast
 Momoe Yamaguchi as Chieko Sada/Myoko
 Tomokazu Miura
 Masaya Oki as Ryusuke Mizuki
 Jun Hamamura
 Akiji Kobayashi as Endō
 Takeshi Katō as Yahei Mizuki
 Keiko Kishi as Shige Sada

Release
Koto received a roadshow theatrical release  in Japan on December 6, 1980 where it was distributed by Toho. It received a regular theatrical release in Japan on December 20, 1980.

Reception
Donald Richie writes in The Japanese Movie that "Ichikawa dramatizes alienation in his remake of Kawabata's Koto, where twin sisters long-separated meet again and must face a dramatized estrangement."

References

Footnotes

Sources

External links
 
 
 

1980 films
Films based on Japanese novels
Films based on works by Yasunari Kawabata
Films directed by Kon Ichikawa
Films with screenplays by Kon Ichikawa
Toho films
1980s Japanese films